Taalman is a surname. In the late middle ages, a taalman was a type of legal functionary in what is now the Netherlands and Belgium.

Taalman is the surname of:
Kyle Taalman, goalkeeper for American soccer club Grand Rapids FC
Laura Taalman, American mathematician
Linda Taalman, participant in Southern California art collective Broodwork